Jamie Waller may refer to:
 Jamie Waller (basketball)
 Jamie Waller (entrepreneur)

See also
 James Waller, Holocaust and genocide studies professor